Charles Everett "Charlie" Dumas (February 12, 1937 – January 5, 2004) was an American high jumper, the 1956 Olympic champion, and the first person to clear 7 ft.(2.13 m)

While attending Compton College, near Los Angeles, Dumas, from Tulsa, Oklahoma, made his memorable jump on June 29, 1956, in the US Olympic Trials in Los Angeles, breaking a barrier previously thought unbreakable.

This jump not only ensured him of a place in the American Olympic team, but also made him the top favorite for the gold medal at the 1956 Summer Olympics. In Melbourne, he did not disappoint, and grabbed the title in a new Olympic Record.

Next, he enrolled at the University of Southern California, winning the  NCAA track and field title with the university team in 1958. In 1960, Dumas competed in his second Olympics, but a knee injury during the competition prevented him from winning a second medal, finishing 6th.

After his career, in which he won five consecutive national high jump titles, Dumas became a teacher, working at several schools in the Los Angeles area (including Jordan High School in Watts). He died of cancer at age 66 in Inglewood, California.  He left behind three children: Keasha Dumas, Kyle Dumas and Ianna Dumas.

He started his jumping career as a student first at Thomas Jefferson High School in South Central Los Angeles for 2 years.  As a sophomore, he finished tied for 4th place at the 1953 CIF California State Meet for Jefferson.  As a junior and senior he jumped for Centennial High School in Compton finishing second in 1954 and winning the state championship by four and a half inches in 1955.  He was Track and Field News "High School Athlete of the Year" in 1955.

References

External links 
 
 
 
 

1937 births
2004 deaths
Sportspeople from Tulsa, Oklahoma
American male high jumpers
Athletes (track and field) at the 1956 Summer Olympics
Athletes (track and field) at the 1959 Pan American Games
Athletes (track and field) at the 1960 Summer Olympics
World record setters in athletics (track and field)
USC Trojans men's track and field athletes
American masters athletes
Track and field athletes from Oklahoma
Medalists at the 1956 Summer Olympics
Pan American Games gold medalists for the United States
Olympic gold medalists for the United States in track and field
Pan American Games medalists in athletics (track and field)
Jefferson High School (Los Angeles) alumni
Medalists at the 1959 Pan American Games